TagPro is a free-to-play online multiplayer capture the flag video game originally designed and programmed by Nick Riggs. The first version was released in February 2013, after Riggs began experimenting with software platform Node.js. The game is named after one of its three obtainable power-ups. It follows the basic rules of capture the flag, along with some modifications, including power-ups, spikes, and other map elements.

Gameplay
Players spawn on opposing sides of a map after being assigned to a team. Each team consists of up to four players, for a maximum total of eight players per game. The player controls a ball using the WASD keys or the arrow keys. Players may obtain power-ups and interact with the various game elements, using them to their team's advantage or to hinder the opposing team. In the traditional game type, players must transport the enemy's flag from the enemy's spawn area to their own spawn area, avoiding enemy players and hazards. In an alternate game type, neutral flag, there is only one flag that both teams compete over to bring to their respective-colored end zones, typically located on the opposite side of the map from the teams' respective spawn area.

Other players can "pop" the flag carrier by coming in contact with their ball. Popping a flag carrier restores the flag to its original base, causes an invisible explosion at the location of the popped ball, and forces the popped ball to respawn. However, if both flag carriers touch each other, both players will pop and both flags will be reset unless one of them has a rolling bomb power up (see below). In the neutral flag game type, the flag carrier transfers the flag to the opponent that pops them. If the flag carrier is popped by an element, the flag is reset to its starting point, typically at the center of the map. The flag is also reset if the flag carrier has a TagPro and is touched by an enemy player (both players pop).

A team scores a point when it successfully returns the enemy's flag to the home location of the team's own flag. A team cannot score while their home flag is in enemy possession; the team must pop the enemy flag carrier before it can capture the enemy's flag. TagPro games last for up to 6 minutes, and end either when a team earns a 3 points differential to win the game. If the game time elapses and both teams are tied, a sudden death overtime starts, where a single cap wins the game, and where all flag carriers are automatically awarded juke juice powerups, and all players receive accumulating and increasing death penalties in the form of increased spawn times.

Elements 
Games of TagPro take place in arenas called maps. A map is randomly chosen for each game from a selection that is changed approximately once a month.

Walls: These stationary blocks come in multiple shapes, and blocks all balls from going through. They bounce just a little bit, to make juking off of walls a possibility.

Speed pads (colloquially Boosts): Speed pads are stationary elements that increase a player's speed to three times their normal speed when the player's ball rolls over them. Yellow-colored speed pads can be used by either team, and red and blue-colored boosts can only be used by balls of the same color. Speed pads become inactive for ten seconds after use.

Spikes: Spikes are fixed, round elements. When a player touches a spike, the player immediately pops.

Team tiles: Team tiles grant additional acceleration and increase a player's maximum speed when on their respective team's color. Being on the other team's color has no effect on a player. The effects of the team tiles can stack with the grip power-up (see below) and any boosts. Team tiles have no effect on a player carrying the flag.

Gates: Gates selectively obstruct balls based on the color of the gate and the color of the ball. Red and blue gates allow players of the same color to pass through them. If a player touches a gate of the opposite color, they pop. The green gate pops players of both teams. The gray gate has no effect on either team, and acts as a regular tile. Each gate has a default color that it exists in at the beginning of each game. Gates can change color when activated by a switch, usually to the color of the player who steps on the switch. However, if one or more players from each team simultaneously activates a gate, the gate will revert to its original state.

Switches: Commonly called buttons, switches can be used to control the colors of a gate, as well as set off bombs. There is no limit to the number of switches that can be linked to a single gate or bomb, nor is there a limit to the number of gates and/or bombs a switch can activate.

Bombs: When a player touches a bomb, or a switch that is connected to a bomb (see above), the bomb detonates and pushes the player (and any other players caught in the blast radius) away from it with a high velocity, similar to a speed pad. They respawn 30 seconds after each use. A bomb's blast radius is not obstructed by walls.

Portals: A portal is an element that allows for instantaneous teleportation from one tile to another. They can be configured by the map author to operate in one or two directions. Map authors can also configure portals' respawn times ("cooldowns").

End Zones: In the neutral flag game mode, there are red and blue checkered tiles in each of the two bases, opposite of each team (blue end zones in red team's spawns, and vice versa). Players must take the flag to the end zone of their own color to score.

Mars ball: The Mars ball is a large ball that is not controlled by a user, but can be moved by in-game physics (bombs, switches, etc.) and by players pushing it. If a team manages to push the Mars Ball to the other team's flag, the team is awarded three points.

Potato: Potatoes replace flags in a specialized game mode. In this game mode, carrying the potato for too long will cause it to explode, popping the player and resetting the potato. The explosion doesn't occur if the potato is captured, or the player holding it dies by other causes. The potato's explosion timer can be configured before the game.

Gravity Wells: Gravity Wells draw players toward them within a fixed radius. If a player touches a gravity well, the player pops.

Power-ups
TagPro has three main power-ups, all of which spawn 1 minute after the beginning of every match, then 1 minute after being picked up. The effects of power-ups last for 20 seconds, and although multiple power-ups can be used simultaneously, power-ups are not stackable (attaining 2 of the same type of power-up will not increase the duration to 40 seconds). The time a player spends dying and respawning counts towards the power-up's time limit.

Rolling bomb: When a player is equipped with this power-up and contacts an enemy, the enemy (and all other nearby players, friend or foe) are pushed away from the player, with no effect on the player. After a player with a rolling bomb is touched, the rolling bomb goes away, making it the only power-up in the game to be potentially one-use. Thus, the rolling bomb acts as a sort of second life for the player. If a player is carrying the enemy's flag, has rolling bomb, and is touched by an enemy player, the player will still hold the flag, and must be touched by an enemy player again to get popped. However, players can still die with a rolling bomb if they hit a spike or a gate. In 2021, some tweaks were made to the powerup, including the ability to save players from spikes and gates. Additionally, it only detonates when saving the player from death, and thus it is no longer possible to remove the rolling bomb by making contact with the player who has it. The player with Rolling Bomb can also activate it at any time by pressing space. 

Grip (colloquially Juke Juice): When a player equips the Grip power-up, it increases the maximum acceleration of their ball, which gives the player greater control over their movements as well as allowing the player to reach their maximum velocity faster.

TagPro: When a player has TagPro, they have the ability to pop any enemy player they collide with, regardless of whether or not the opponent is carrying the flag. Unlike the rolling bomb, however, if the player is holding a flag while they have TagPro, and are touched by an enemy player, they will pop (as will the enemy who touched them) and lose the flag.

Top speed: Top speed was a power-up that allows the player to have a higher maximum velocity once they reach that point. Because a player had to accelerate first in order to reap the effects of this powerup, it was retired, as it was deemed to be too weak and the effects not noticeable (i.e. a weaker and earlier version of the Grip power-up).

Other aspects

Leveling up and flair
In TagPro, players' levels are expressed in degrees (°). Players begin the game at 0° and gain degrees by winning games. When a user reaches certain degrees or completes a miscellaneous achievement, they unlock a "flair". Their flair and degrees shows up next to their name while in-game. Degrees are earned by winning games, with each successive degree requiring more wins than the last.

Event Flairs are awarded for specific performance during special events such as on holidays like Christmas and St. Patrick's Day. Often the game developers will create a brand new alternate gametype for the special event.

Communication
Players can communicate using an in-game chat feature. Players can send messages to all players, to their team only or if they are in a group they can send chat to their group. Team messages are often used to discuss strategy or to alert teammates to the location of the other team's players. Many players also use VoIP applications such as Mumble and Discord to communicate verbally during organized games.

Modding 
Mods in TagPro are supported by the developers through the use of texture packs. There are many pre-made texture packs that can be changed from the profile page, and many more custom texture packs have been made and shared by community members. 

TagPro also has an unorganized community of modders that make all sorts of visual, auditory or mechanics changing additions to the game. These are mainly in the form of userscripts, but there are also a few browser extensions available. A list of most of them can be found on the official TagPro wiki on their reddit community.

Competitive TagPro
The North American-based Major League TagPro (MLTP), which is based on the traditional capture-the-flag game style, is the most well-known and longest-running TagPro league, with its first season dating back to June 2013. Competitive TagPro leagues begin with a draft pick when club franchises can submit bids for players; draft picks are typically streamed live on Twitch. Minor League TagPro (mLTP) is MLTP's second division, while Novice League TagPro is its third and lowest tier (NLTP). The player bases for the organized TagPro leagues in Europe (ELTP) and Oceania (OLTP) are equally devoted.

Community
TagPro has been recognized for its particularly active community, especially on Reddit. The community often hosts tournaments, including several world championships and charity fundraising tournaments. The TagPro community has developed many organized competitive environments based around the many game type variations, including standard capture the flag, neutral flag, TagPro Racing, Eggball, and special event speedrunning challenges.

Reception
TagPro has received positive reviews. Peter Cilento of The Richest gave a mostly positive review, as he listed ten "reasons you need to start playing TagPro", two of which were "You can play with friends or strangers" and "it's addicting". Max Mallory of Indie Game Insider said TagPro "Is an amazing game" and complimented the fact that "Your basic TagPro arsenal isn’t in-game weapons or player boosts, but your ability to predict the positions of your opponents." Tom Sykes of PC Gamer listed TagPro as one of the games in his "free webgame round-up". He wrote, "TagPro doesn't look like much, and it's a little too ad-heavy for my liking, but there's a tactical, seemingly well balanced online multiplayer game waiting for you behind all that."

References

External links
 
 Reddit Community

2013 video games
Multiplayer online games
Video games developed in the United States